Keepin' the Horse Between Me and the Ground is the eighth studio album by American blues musician Seasick Steve. It was released on October 7, 2016. and peaked 8 on the UK Albums Chart.

Background 
On June 5, 2016, Seasick Steve announced Keepin' the Horse Between Me and the Ground from his YouTube channel. Shortly after, a European tour was announced, with concerts in Paris, Zurich, Amsterdam among others.

Track listing

CD 1

CD 2

Charts

References

External links
Official website

2016 albums
Seasick Steve albums